Japanese football in 1938.

Emperor's Cup

Births
July 4 - Masakatsu Miyamoto
August 9 - Takehiko Kawanishi
August 20 - Tatsuya Shiji
November 6 - Seishiro Shimatani

External links

 
Seasons in Japanese football